Hopkinton is a town in Merrimack County, New Hampshire, United States. The population was 5,914 at the 2020 census. The town has three distinct communities: Hopkinton village, mainly a residential area in the center of the town; Contoocook, the town's business hub, located in the north; and West Hopkinton, within the more agricultural portion of the town. The town is home to the Hopkinton State Fair, adjacent to Contoocook village, and to the historic Contoocook Railroad Depot and the Contoocook Railroad Bridge, the oldest covered railroad bridge in the United States.

History

The town was granted by colonial Governor Jonathan Belcher in 1735 as "Number 5" to settlers from Hopkinton, Massachusetts, who renamed it "New Hopkinton". First settled in 1736, colonists were required to build homes, fence in their land, plant it with English grass, and provide a home for a minister, all within seven years. The community was incorporated in 1765 by Governor Benning Wentworth, predating the establishment of counties in the colonial province. Built in 1789, the Congregational Church has a Revere bell. The state legislature met in Hopkinton occasionally between 1798 and 1807. In 1808, the town competed for the coveted position of state capital, but was defeated by neighboring Concord. Since 1823, the town has been within Merrimack County.

A substantial portion of the town in the north was named "Contoocook Village", for a tribe of the Pennacook people who once lived there. Due to its position along the Contoocook River, it became a center for water-powered industry, particularly lumber and textiles. The Contoocook covered railroad bridge in the village is a remnant of the Boston & Maine Railroad and is the oldest covered bridge of its kind still standing in the United States. Next to the bridge is the Contoocook Railroad Depot, one of the original railroad depots for the Concord and Claremont Railroad.

Since 1915, Hopkinton has been home to the Hopkinton State Fair, an event which attracts thousands of visitors each year during the Labor Day weekend.

Geography
Hopkinton is drained by the Contoocook River and its tributary, the Warner River, except for the southeast part of town, which drains to the Turkey River. Hopkinton lies fully within the Merrimack River watershed.

Adjacent municipalities 
 Webster (north)
 Concord (east)
 Bow (southeast)
 Dunbarton (southeast)
 Weare (south)
 Henniker (west)
 Warner (northwest)

Demographics

As of the census of 2010, there were 5,589 people, 2,204 households, and 1,631 families residing in the town.  The population density was 124.7 people per square mile (48.2/km2). The racial makeup of the town was 97.7% White, 0.3% African American, 0.1% Native American, 0.6% Asian, 0.07% Pacific Islander, 0.1% from other races, and 1.2% from two or more races. Hispanic or Latino of any race were 1% of the population.

There were 2,204 households, out of which 32.8% had children under the age of 18 living with them, 63.1% were married couples living together, 7% had a female householder with no husband present, and 26% were non-families. 19.6% of all households were made up of individuals living alone, and 6.3% had someone living alone who was 65 years of age or older.  The average household size was 2.54 and the average family size was 2.92.

In the town, the population was spread out, with 25.3% under the age of 20, 3.3% from 20 to 24, 20.1% from 25 to 44, 35.2% from 45 to 64, and 16.2% who were 65 years of age or older.  The median age was 45.8 years.

The median income for a household in the town was $84,911, and the median income for a family was $88,796. Males had a median income of $53,806 versus $45,656 for females. The per capita income for the town was $40,580.  About 4.2% of the population was below the poverty line.

Government
In the New Hampshire Senate, Hopkinton is in the 15th District, represented by Democrat Dan Feltes. On the New Hampshire Executive Council, Hopkinton is in the 2nd District, represented by Democrat Andru Volinsky. In the United States House of Representatives, Hopkinton is in New Hampshire's 2nd congressional district, represented by Democrat Ann McLane Kuster.

Education
Public education is managed by the Hopkinton School District.  Kindergarten through third-grade students attend Harold Martin School in Hopkinton village, and fourth through sixth graders attend Maple Street School in Contoocook village. The middle school is combined with Hopkinton High School in Contoocook village, which serves seventh through twelfth graders, and its sports teams are nicknamed the Hawks.

Hopkinton High School consistently performs highly amongst other public schools in New Hampshire. According to a study conducted in early 2014 by U.S. News & World Report, Hopkinton High School was ranked 1st among New Hampshire's public schools. Hopkinton High School has also been awarded a national silver medal and is ranked nationally #711 of the 19,400 public schools in the US. The school has ranked 1st consistently by U.S. News in 2015 and 2016. Hopkinton High School consistently ranks within the top 10% of public schools in New Hampshire.

The town of Hopkinton also includes The Beech Hill School, an independent middle school serving grades 6th through 8th.

Notable people 
 Rose Flanders Bascom (1880–1915), first American female lion tamer
 Carlton Chase (1794–1870), bishop of the Episcopal Diocese of New Hampshire
 Thomas Corbett (1780–1857), Shaker doctor that was well known nationally for his botanical medicines
 Alvan Flanders (1825–1894), delegate from the Territory of Washington
 John Williams Gunnison (1812–1853), captain and surveyor with Corps of Topographical Engineers; attended Hopkinton Academy
 Matthew Harvey (1781–1866), lawyer, politician; 13th Governor of New Hampshire
 Otto Heino (1915–2009), husband of Vivika, ceramics artist
 Vivika Heino (1910–1995), wife of Otto, ceramics artist
 John S.C. Knowlton (1798–1871), newspaper editor, publisher, politician
 Annie Kuster (born 1956), current U.S. congresswoman representing New Hampshire's Second District
 Mary Greenleaf Clement Leavitt (1830–1912), first round-the-world missionary for the Woman's Christian Temperance Union
 Stephen Harriman Long (1784–1864), engineer, explorer, inventor
 David Luneau (born 1965), Democratic member of the New Hampshire House of Representatives, inventor
 John Lynch (born 1952), 80th Governor of New Hampshire
 Susan Lynch, First Lady of New Hampshire to John Lynch
 George H. Perkins (1836–1899), Commodore for the United States Navy
 Isabel Weld Perkins (1876–1948), Boston area heiress, author and daughter of George H. Perkins
 Elizabeth Wentworth Roberts (1871–1927), painter; founder of the Concord Art Association
 Tina Satter, New York City-based playwright and director
 Irene Shepard (1922–2014), educator, politician
 David Souter (born 1939), former associate justice of the US Supreme Court
 Richard Sylla, writer, professor
 Susan Ware (born 1950), writer and editor at the American National Biography

National Register of Historic Places

|}

Sites of interest
 Hopkinton Historical Society
 First Congregational Church of Hopkinton
 Contoocook Depot and Restored Pullman Passenger Coach
 Contoocook Railroad Bridge
 Rowell's Covered Bridge
 Perkins Manor
 Howe-Quimby House
 Stanley Tavern
 St. Methodios Faith and Heritage Center
 Concord-Lake Sunapee Rail Trail

References

External links

 
 Hopkinton & Contoocook Visitor Center
 Hopkinton Town Library
 Hopkinton State Fair
 New Hampshire Economic and Labor Market Information Bureau Profile

 
Towns in Merrimack County, New Hampshire
Populated places established in 1765
1765 establishments in New Hampshire
Towns in New Hampshire